Houthalen-Helchteren is a municipality located in the Belgian province of Limburg. Houthalen-Helchteren consists of Houthalen-centrum, Houthalen-Oost, Helchteren, Sonnis, Laak, Meulenberg and Lillo. On 1 January 2020 Houthalen-Helchteren had a total population of around 30.000. The total area is 78.27 km² which gives a population density of 389 inhabitants per km².

Geography 
Houthalen-Helchteren is located near the watershed between the Meuse and the Scheldt. In the immediate vicinity the Dommel (which flows to the Meuse near Den Bosch), the Grote Nete (which flows to the Scheldt) and the Neer (that joins the Meuse just south of Roermond) all originate.

History of Helchteren 
Helchteren could have become famous in 1702 when, during the War of the Spanish Succession, a French Army under Boufflers faced an alliance army under Marlborough. A battle could have ensued, but instead it came to the not so famous cannonade of Helchteren. The cannonade itself is however a seldom occurring event in military history.

Notable people
 Ingrid Daubechies (born in Houthalen on 17 August 1954) physicist and mathematician.
 Nemo (Belgian band) was founded here in 1991.
 Divock Origi (raised in Houthalen) professional footballer.
 Adolf Hitler stayed in Helchteren during world war 2 for 2 months.

References

External links
 
Official website - Information available in Dutch and limited information available in English.
Helchteren at the Spanish Succession - Information about the cannonade at Helchteren in 1702.
Digital Archive Marburg - Maps of the cannonade at Helchteren in 1702.

Municipalities of Limburg (Belgium)